Tufi Duek (born May 31, 1954, in Nilópolis, Rio de Janeiro, Brazil) is a Brazilian fashion designer and creator of the Triton and Forum (marketed outside Brazil as Tufi Duek) brands, which have an international following.

Information
Tufi Duek has become one of the most iconic jeanswear labels in his home country, Brazil. Although he is famous for his jeans, his brand is also well known for the more sophisticated evening dresses. His most popular labels are "Forum" and "Triton".  The Forum label  is derived from sensuality while the Triton label  revolves around the ideas of preppy and young.  He also has a six-year contract with the art director, Giovanni Bianco.

External links

References

Brazilian Jews
Brazilian fashion designers
Duek, Tufi
Duek, Tufi
People from Nilópolis